Jeolgang Si clan is one of the Korean clans. Their Bon-gwan is in Zhejiang, China. According to the research held in 2015, the number of Jeolgang Si clan’s member was 2011. Their founder was  who was a general in Ming dynasty. He fought in Japanese invasions of Korea (1592–98) as Ming dynasty’s Central Army. He was settled in North Gyeongsang Province because he was injured during the war and was not able to come back to his country. After that, ’s descendant founded Jeolgang Si clan and made Zhejiang, Jeolgang Si clan’s Bon-gwan.

See also 
 Korean clan names of foreign origin

References

External links 
 

 
Korean clan names of Chinese origin
Si clans